Clarence Lester "Biggie" Munn (September 11, 1908 – March 18, 1975) was an American football player, coach, and college athletics administrator. He was the head football coach at Albright College (1935–1936), Syracuse University (1946), and most notably Michigan State College (1947–1953), where his 1952 squad won a national championship.  Munn retired from coaching in 1953 to assume duties as Michigan State's athletic director, a position he held until 1971.  Each year, the Michigan State Spartans football team hands out the "Biggie Munn Award" to the team's most motivational player.  MSU's Munn Ice Arena, built in 1974, is named in his honor.  Munn was inducted into the College Football Hall of Fame as a coach in 1959, and, in 1961, he became Michigan State's first inductee into the Michigan Sports Hall of Fame.  He authored the coaching textbook Michigan State Multiple Offense in 1953.

Early life and playing career
Munn was born in the former Grow Township, now known as Andover, Minnesota.  A 1932 graduate of the University of Minnesota, he played guard and fullback for the Golden Gophers under head coach Fritz Crisler.  Munn was a two-time first-team All-Big Ten Conference selection and during his senior year in 1931, he served football team captain, was a consensus All-American, and was awarded the Chicago Tribune Silver Football as the Big Ten's best player.  Many considered Munn as the top collegiate punter in the nation.  He stood just under six feet and weighed 215 pounds, but was recorded running 100 yards in 10 seconds.  Munn also served as captain of Minnesota's track and field team.

Early coaching career
Three years after his playing career ended, Munn got his first head coaching job at Albright College in Reading, Pennsylvania, where he stayed for two seasons (1935–1936), compiling a record of 13–2–1.  From 1938 to 1945, he was an assistant football coach at the University of Michigan, once again under Crisler.  Munn served as head coach at Syracuse University for one season in 1946 before leaving for Michigan State. One of Munn's assistants at Syracuse was former Orangeman standout Duffy Daugherty, who followed Munn to Michigan State and assisted him there for seven seasons before succeeding Munn as head coach. Munn is one of the few people to have coached at both Michigan State and its archrival Michigan.

Coaching career at Michigan State
In 1947, Munn and the Michigan State administration, led by university president John A. Hannah, approached Notre Dame president Father Cavanaugh to have his Fighting Irish play the Spartans for the first time since 1921.  MSU initially offered to let Notre Dame take 80 percent of the gate, but Cavanaugh insisted they split the receipts down the middle.  Munn was the only coach to beat Notre Dame head coach Frank Leahy three years in a row (1950–1952).

Munn developed the "Wingback Deep" formation of his formula "Michigan State Multiple Offense."  The play featured a shifting back and forth between a T-formation and a single-wing formation with a direct snap to the tailback between a T-formation quarterback's legs.

On the Michigan State dressing room wall, Munn hung a statement on fundamentals that his players were required to read before every home game: "Do not cheat your team or your teammates.  Know your plays.  Block.  Protect.  Add to what we are trying to do. [signed] Biggie."

During the latter part of his coaching career, Munn developed the talents of Willie Thrower, the Big Ten's first black quarterback.  In 1953 with the Chicago Bears, Thrower became the first black quarterback to play in the National Football League.

In 1952, Munn was named the AFCA Coach of the Year, coaching MSU to 9–0 record and a national championship. In 1953, Michigan State's first year of conference play in the Big Ten, the Spartans shared the conference title with Illinois and went to the Rose Bowl, where they beat UCLA, 28–20.

Shortly after the Rose Bowl victory, MSU's athletic director, Ralph Young retired.  Munn stepped down from coaching to assume duties as athletic director and remained in that position until 1971.  Munn named his assistant, Duffy Daugherty, as his to successor to helm the football team.

During his tenure as Michigan State's head football coach, Munn tutored 17 All-Americans. His teams have retained the school's top four season marks for rushing-yards-per-game: 1948 (304.5 yards/game), 1951 (293.9 yards), 1952 (272.4), and 1950 (269.3).

Munn was inducted into the College Football Hall of Fame in 1959.  Syracuse University enshrined him in its hall of fame in 1973.  Munn was inducted into Minnesota's "M" Club in 1993.

Family and death
Munn married the former Vera Jane Wattles (January 21, 1905 – January 4, 2004) in June 1935. The couple adopted two children: Michael and Jane Austin.  Clarence Munn died on March 18, 1975, in Lansing, Michigan, at the age of 66.

Head coaching record

Football

Coaching tree
Played under:
 Clarence Spears: Minnesota
 Fritz Crisler: Minnesota

Coached under:
 Fritz Crisler: Michigan

Assistant coaches who became head coaches:
 Reaves Baysinger: Syracuse
 Duffy Daugherty: Michigan State
 Bob Devaney: Wyoming, Nebraska
 Dan Devine: Arizona State, Missouri, Notre Dame, Green Bay Packers (NFL)
 Earle Edwards: North Carolina State
 Forest Evashevski: Washington State, Iowa
 Dewey King: San Jose State, Wheaton
 Frank Kush: Arizona State, Hamilton Tiger-Cats (CFL), Baltimore/Indianapolis Colts, (NFL), Arizona Outlaws, (USFL)
 Steve Sebo: Penn
 Kip Taylor: Oregon State
 Doug Weaver: Kansas State, Southern Illinois

Former players who went on to become head coaches
 Hank Bullough: New England Patriots (NFL), Buffalo Bills (NFL)
 Al Dorow: Hamilton Tiger Cats (CFL)
 Rollie Dotsch: Northern Michigan, Birmingham Stallions (USFL)
 Chuck Fairbanks: Oklahoma, Colorado, New England Patriots (NFL), New Jersey Generals (USFL)
 Sonny Grandelius: Colorado

Although not a head coach, Dick Tamburo played under Munn at Michigan State and later served as Athletic Director at Texas Tech, Arizona State, and Missouri.

Bibliography

References

External links
 

1908 births
1975 deaths
American football fullbacks
American football guards
Albright Lions football coaches
Albright Lions men's basketball coaches
Michigan Wolverines football coaches
Michigan State Spartans athletic directors
Michigan State Spartans football coaches
Minnesota Golden Gophers football coaches
Minnesota Golden Gophers football players
Syracuse Orange football coaches
All-American college football players
College Football Hall of Fame inductees
People from Andover, Minnesota
Coaches of American football from Minnesota
Players of American football from Minnesota
Basketball coaches from Minnesota